Austen King (born May 2, 1990) is an American soccer player.

Career

College and amateur

King played for Elon University from 2008 to 2011. During his career with the Phoenix King appeared in 57 games and scored 3 goals. He was named first team All-SoCon as a junior and helped lead Elon to the 2011 Southern Conference Championship as a senior. In 2011 King also played for the Carolina Railhawks U-23 team which won the USASA U-23 National Championship.

Professional

On February 15, 2012 the Carolina RailHawks announced that they had signed King for the 2012 NASL season. King appeared in 20 games for the Railhawks in 2012 and scored 1 goal. On November 29, 2012 the Railhawks announced that they had exercised a club option to bring King back for 2013.

References

External links
 Elon University bio

1990 births
Living people
American soccer players
Elon Phoenix men's soccer players
North Carolina FC players
Louisville City FC players
North American Soccer League players
USL Championship players
Association football defenders
Soccer players from North Carolina
People from Wilson, North Carolina